Neapolitan sauce, also called Napoli sauce or Napoletana sauce, is the collective name given (outside Italy) to various basic tomato-based sauces derived from Italian cuisine, often served over or alongside pasta.
 
In Naples, Neapolitan sauce is simply referred to as la salsa, which literally translates to the sauce. Basil, bay leaf, thyme, oregano, peppercorns, cloves, olives, and mushrooms may be included depending on taste preferences. Some variants include carrots and celery. Outside Italy, the basic sauce is vegetarian, although meat such as minced beef or sausage can be added. By contrast, in Italy, the sauce dish carrying Naples in its name is a sauce called Neapolitan ragù.
 
Many Italians do not know what Neapolitan sauce is, especially in association with some recipe names such as, for instance, "spaghetti napolitana". The name itself, in fact, is not even spelled in proper Italian.

Origin

Historically, the first Italian cookbook to include a tomato based sauce, Lo Scalco alla Moderna (The Modern Steward), was written by Italian chef Antonio Latini and was published in two volumes in 1692 and 1694. Latini served as the Steward of the First Minister to the Spanish Viceroy of Naples.

See also
Naporitan

References

External links

Tomato sauces
Italian sauces
Neapolitan cuisine